Grand/Cicero is a commuter railroad station in the Austin neighborhood on the West Side of Chicago and is  away from Chicago Union Station, the eastern terminus of the line. As of 2018, Grand/Cicero is the 199th busiest of Metra's 236 non-downtown stations, with an average of 80 weekday boardings. The station is located at the corner of West Grand Avenue and North Cicero Avenue. Service to the station began on December 11, 2006. The station is served by the Milwaukee District West Line. Metra's North Central Service trains use these tracks but do not stop. Grand/Cicero station is closed on weekends, holidays, and after 6:30 P.M.

As of December 12, 2022, Grand/Cicero is served as a flag stop by 16 trains (10 inbound, six outbound) on weekdays only.

The opening of Grand/Cicero was accompanied by the closure of two other stations, Cragin and Hermosa. These stations were located nearby in residential neighborhoods. The station is also in the vicinity of a section of the Belt Railway of Chicago.

Chicago's first Walmart, at 4650 West North Avenue, opened just south of this station in September 2006.

Bus connections
CTA
  54 Cicero 
  65 Grand 
  73 Armitage

References

External links

Cicero Avenue entrance from Google Maps Street View

Metra stations in Chicago
Railway stations in the United States opened in 2006